Bangladesh–France relations relate to the foreign relationship between Bangladesh and France.

History 

The French first arrived in Bengal during the late 17th century. They maintained trading posts in Dhaka and other cities. In 1757, France sent a contingent of troops to Bengal to fight against the British in the Battle of Plassey.

High level visits 
In 1990, French President François Mitterrand paid an official visit to Bangladesh. Bangladesh Prime Minister Sheikh Hasina paid an official visit to Paris in 1999. Former Bangladesh Foreign Ministers Morshed Khan and Dipu Moni paid official visits to France in 2006 and 2010 respectively.

Cultural relations 
Alliance Française has been promoting French culture in Bangladesh since 1959. French archaeologists have been working on the excavation of Mahasthangarh since 1993 and have made a number of important discoveries.

Economic relations 
As of 2012, the bilateral trade between the two countries stood at $1.647 billion of which Bangladesh's export to France amounts to $1.513 billion. Bangladesh mainly exports knitwear, woven garments, frozen food, agricultural products, leather, jute and jute goods to France. France's main export items include chemical products, electronics, transport products, wood and paper.

See also
 Foreign relations of Bangladesh
 Foreign relations of France

References

Further reading
 

 
France
Bilateral relations of France